The Ministry of Agriculture and Forestry is the state sector organisation of Equatorial Guinea that deals with matters relating to agriculture, forestry and biosecurity.  The responsible minister is the Minister of Agriculture Teodorin Nguema Obiang Mangue.

Responsibilities
The ministry is responsible for biosecurity, managing Equatorial Guinea's state forests, supporting rural communities, ensuring the humane and responsible use of animals, and helping win access to overseas markets for Equatorial Guinea products. It also works to promote sustainability in the Equatorial Guinea's rural sectors, and to manage land, water and irrigation in rural Equatorial Guinea.

See also
Agriculture in Equatorial Guinea
Forestry in Equatorial Guinea

External links
Ministry of Agriculture and Forestry

Agricultural organisations based in Equatorial Guinea
Agriculture and Forestry
Equatorial Guinea
Equatorial Guinea
Equatorial Guinea
Equatorial Guinea